Pulpit Peak is a  mountain summit located one km south of Hector Lake in Banff National Park, in the Canadian Rockies of Alberta, Canada. Its nearest higher peak is Lilliput Mountain,  to the southwest. Pulpit Peak is situated east of the Waputik Icefield, and is a member of the Waputik Mountains.

History

Pulpit Peak was named in 1898 by Charles Sproull Thompson (1869-1921), who participated in numerous first ascents in the Canadian Rockies. He believed the peak resembled a pulpit in a church. The mountain's name was officially adopted in 1924 by the Geographical Names Board of Canada.

Geology

Like other mountains in Banff Park, Pulpit Peak is composed of sedimentary rock laid down during the Precambrian to Jurassic periods. Formed in shallow seas, this sedimentary rock was pushed east and over the top of younger rock during the Laramide orogeny.

Climate

Based on the Köppen climate classification, Pulpit Peak is located in a subarctic climate zone with cold, snowy winters, and mild summers. Temperatures can drop below -20 °C with wind chill factors below -30 °C. Precipitation runoff from Pulpit Peak drains into the Bow River  which is a tributary of the Saskatchewan River.

See also
List of mountains of Canada
Geography of Alberta

References

External links
 Parks Canada web site: Banff National Park
 Pulpit Peak photo: Flickr

Two-thousanders of Alberta
Mountains of Banff National Park
Canadian Rockies